Rimvydas Šalčius (born January 30, 1985) is a Lithuanian former swimmer, who specialized in butterfly events. He is a multiple-time Lithuanian champion, and a two-time national record holder in both the men's butterfly and medley relay events. He also set a junior record time of 53.25 seconds by winning the gold medal in the men's 100 m butterfly at the 2003 European Championships in Glasgow, Scotland.

Salcius made his Olympic debut, as a 19-year-old, at the 2004 Summer Olympics in Athens, where he competed in the men's 100 m butterfly. He touched out Colombia's Camilo Becerra by a quarter of a second (0.25) to take a fourth spot and thirty-fifth overall in the fourth heat, with a time of 54.45 seconds.

At the 2008 Summer Olympics in Beijing, Salcius qualified for his second Lithuanian team in the men's 100 m butterfly. He cleared a FINA B-standard entry time of 54.16 from the European Championships in Eindhoven, Netherlands. Unlike his previous Games, Salcius posted his lifetime best and broke a Lithuanian record of 52.90 seconds to touch the wall first in heat 3 by less than 0.18 of a second ahead of three-time Olympian Jeremy Knowles of the Bahamas. Salcius failed to advance again into the semifinals, as he placed thirty-fourth out of 66 swimmers in the prelims. He also tied his position with Canada's Joe Bartoch.

References

External links
NBC Olympics Profile

1985 births
Living people
Lithuanian male butterfly swimmers
Olympic swimmers of Lithuania
Swimmers at the 2004 Summer Olympics
Swimmers at the 2008 Summer Olympics
Sportspeople from Kaunas